Ghumattus is a monotypic genus of Indian jumping spiders containing the single species, Ghumattus primus. It was first described by Jerzy Prószyński in 1992, and is only found in India.

References

Monotypic Salticidae genera
Salticidae
Spiders of the Indian subcontinent